Dean Burmester (born 2 June 1989) is a South African professional golfer who plays in the LIV Golf League, as well as having status on the European Tour and Sunshine Tour. He formerly played on the PGA Tour.

Early life
Burmester was born in Mutare, Zimbabwe but represents South Africa in golf.

His father, Mark Burmester, played international cricket for Zimbabwe while his mother Michelle holds (as of 2022) the women's course record at Royal Harare Golf Club, his home course.

Career

Burmester  has won eight times on the Sunshine Tour, including the 2015 Golden Pilsener Zimbabwe Open. He also won the 2017 Tshwane Open which was a co-sanctioned Sunshine Tour and European Tour event.

In May 2021, Burmester claimed his second European Tour victory at the Tenerife Open. He shot a final round 62 to beat Nicolai von Dellingshausen by five shots. In November later that year, Burmester won the PGA Championship on the Sunshine Tour, claiming his eighth victory on the tour.

In August 2022, Burmester finished in fourth place at the Albertsons Boise Open on the Korn Ferry Tour. The following week he finished T46 at the Nationwide Children's Hospital Championship. These results secured his place within the Top 25 of the Korn Ferry Tour Finals; earning Burmester a PGA Tour card for the 2022–23 season.

In February 2023, Burmester joined LIV Golf.

Professional wins (9)

European Tour wins (2)

1Co-sanctioned by the Sunshine Tour

Sunshine Tour wins (8)

1Co-sanctioned by the European Tour

Sunshine Tour playoff record (0–1)

Results in major championships
Results not in chronological order before 2019 and in 2020.

CUT = missed the half-way cut
"T" = tied
NT = No tournament due to COVID-19 pandemic

Results in World Golf Championships

"T" = Tied

See also
2022 Korn Ferry Tour Finals graduates

References

External links

South African male golfers
Sunshine Tour golfers
European Tour golfers
PGA Tour golfers
LIV Golf players
Korn Ferry Tour graduates
Sportspeople from Mutare
Sportspeople from Bloemfontein
White South African people
1989 births
Living people